Mulan Joins the Army is a 1928 Chinese film directed by Hou Yao for the China Sun Motion Picture Company. China Sun invested 30,000 yuan to send a 20-member crew to Northern China to make use of four hundred soldiers during filming. Unfortunately for China Sun, the film was beaten to release in 1927 by competitor Tianyi Film Company's Hua Mulan Joins the Army (Hua Mulan Congjun), which was directed by Li Pingqian and starred Hu Shan, the younger sister of the famed Hu Die.

This film is believed to be a lost film.

Cast

 Li Dandan as Hua Mulan
 Liang Menghen (梁夢痕)
 Lim Cho Cho (林楚楚)

References

External links
 dianying.com entry
 Picture of Li Dandan as Mulan
 

1928 films
1928 lost films
Chinese silent films
Lost Chinese films
Silent films in color
Films directed by Hou Yao
Films about Hua Mulan